Luís Gonzaga Ferreira da Silva, S.J. (2 April 1923 – 7 August 2013) was a Portuguese Prelate of the Catholic Church. Silva was born in Rebordões, Portugal and ordained a priest on 11 July 1953 from the religious order of the Society of Jesus. He was appointed bishop of the Diocese of Lichinga on 10 November 1972 and ordained on 17 December 1972. He retired from the Diocese of Lichinga on 25 January 2003. After his retirement he returned to the Angonia district on the other side of the Lake Malawi, where he came from Portugal as a missionary priest from the Society of Jesus in the 1950s. He served as assistant parish priest among the Christian communities there. He died on 7 August 2013, a week after a heart attack.

External links
Catholic-Hierarchy 

20th-century Roman Catholic bishops in Mozambique
21st-century Roman Catholic bishops in Mozambique
20th-century Portuguese Jesuits
Portuguese Roman Catholic bishops in Africa
1923 births
2013 deaths
Jesuit bishops
Jesuit missionaries
Portuguese Roman Catholic missionaries
People from Santo Tirso
Roman Catholic bishops of Lichinga
Portuguese expatriates in Mozambique
21st-century Portuguese Jesuits